Rudge is a hamlet in the civil parish of Beckington in the Mendip district of Somerset, England. Its nearest town is Frome.

Location
The hamlet is located 2.5 miles (4 km) west of Westbury, Wiltshire, and 1.5 miles (2.4 km) east of A36 road going from Bath to Warminster.

The neighbouring villages are Rode, Southwick, Dilton Marsh and Beckington.

Amenities
The Full Moon pub has developed from a small pub, now having letting rooms and a restaurant.

Since 1946, a public telephone and kiosk were placed outside the pub. It is now an Information Point [RIP] and mini book exchange.

History
The Old Manor House, sometimes known as Rudgehill Farm, was built in the early 17th century and refronted in 1692.

The Baptist Chapel at Rudge was founded at the beginning of the 19th century.

The Methodist Chapel in the centre of Rudge, which was built in 1839. It is now a private house.

The electricity supply to Rudge was completed by 1950, and the piped water supply was laid on in 1954.

Notable people
The English poet Samuel Daniel settled at Rudge and died here in 1619; he is buried in the nearby St George's Church, Beckington.

References

External links

 Beckington village history

Villages in Mendip District